American Financial Group, Inc. is an American financial services holding company based in Cincinnati, Ohio.  Its primary businesses are insurance and investments.

Lines of business

American Financial Group's major insurance division operates as the Great American Insurance Company, founded in 1872, and focuses on property and casualty insurance services. Other affiliates and subsidiaries include Great American Custom, Mid-Continent Group, National Interstate, and Republic Indemnity. Additional insurance specialties include (but are not limited to) equine, trucking, executive liability, fidelity and crime, and agribusiness. Great American Financial Resources is a wholly owned subsidiary of American Financial Group and supplies a range of annuities, life insurance products and supplemental insurances to individuals and enterprises.

The parent company, AFG, is owned principally by the family of financier Carl Lindner, Jr., who bought the company in 1973 and served as its chairman until his death in 2011. The senior Lindner's sons, Carl H. Lindner III and S. Craig Lindner serve as co-chief executive officer.

History

American Financial Group was ranked 486th on the Fortune 500 list in 2004. Through the years American Financial Group has owned a number of subsidiaries, real estate properties, and companies, including The Mountain View Grand Resort & Spa in Whitefield, New Hampshire, The Cincinnatian in Cincinnati, Ohio, The Biltmore in Coral Gables, Florida, Le Pavillon in New Orleans, Louisiana, and the Charleston Harbor Resort and Marina in Charleston, South Carolina. Great American Insurance Group partnered with the Cincinnati Reds baseball team to purchase naming rights for Great American Ball Park.

The company announced in December 2007 that they will combine their offices and move their headquarters to the brand new Great American Insurance Building at Queen City Square in 2011.

American Financial Group was one of the first publicly traded Fortune 500 companies to make political donations after corporations' freedom of speech rights were expanded to include donations as a result of the Citizens United v. Federal Election Commission decision. Carl Lindner, Jr is a longtime top Republican donor, donating millions of his personal income to candidates and political action committees, which sent ripples in campaign finance circles during the 2010 mid-term elections. American Financial, of which Lindner has a non-majority 42% share, donated $400,000 to the Republican-allied PAC American Crossroads.

See also

 List of S&P 400 companies

References

External links

 Great American Insurance Company website

Financial services companies established in 1872
Companies listed on the New York Stock Exchange
Holding companies established in 1872
Companies based in Cincinnati
Financial services companies of the United States
Lindner family
American companies established in 1872